Cunningham Peak is a mainly ice-covered peak,  high, at the head of Gowan Glacier along the Founders Escarpment, in the Heritage Range. It was mapped by the United States Geological Survey from surveys and from U.S. Navy air photos, 1961–66, and named by the Advisory Committee on Antarctic Names for Ship's Serviceman John B. Cunningham, U.S. Navy, in charge of the McMurdo Station ship's store and laundry during U.S. Navy Operation Deep Freeze 1966.

See also
 Mountains in Antarctica

References
 

Mountains of Ellsworth Land